Dewlanwala  is a village in Kapurthala district of Punjab State, India. The village is administrated by a Sarpanch, who is an elected representative.

Demography 
According to the report published by Census India in 2011, Dewlanwala has a total number of 194 houses and population of 932 of which include 497 males and 435 females. Literacy rate of Dewlanwala is 68.81%, lower than state average of 75.84%. The population of children under the age of 6 years is 108 which is  11.59% of total population of Dewlanwala, and child sex ratio is approximately  800, lower than state average of 846.

Caste  
The village has schedule caste (SC) constitutes 54.18% of total population of the village and it doesn't have any Schedule Tribe (ST) population.

Population data

Air travel connectivity 
The closest airport to the village is Sri Guru Ram Dass Jee International Airport.

Villages in Kapurthala

External links
  Villages in Kapurthala
 Kapurthala Villages List

References

Villages in Kapurthala district